Beatrix de Rijke (1421 – 1468), was a Dutch foundling in Dordrecht in 1421.

Biography
According to Mathias Balen in his 1677 Description of the city of Dordrecht, she was a survivor of the St. Elizabeth's flood (1421). Her wicker cradle was found floating on the water, and besides the baby, it contained a cat. The small cradle with baby and cat are included as one of the details of the 1490 panorama of the flood by the Master of the St Elizabeth Panels, on view at the Rijksmuseum in Amsterdam. The subject was romantic enough to be expanded over time. The baby was given the name Beatrix de Rijke, who married Jacob Roerom. She was also called Beatrix de Gelukkige (Beatrix the lucky one). The flood itself, first recording the loss of 18 villages, by 1677 had grown to encompass 72 villages. Today the story of the "cat in the cradle" is told at Kinderdijk, near Rotterdam, while the 1490 painting is said to have been donated as an altarpiece by the town of Wieldrecht, near Dordrecht.

References

Beatrix de Rijke in 1001 Vrouwen uit de Nederlandse geschiedenis
Kind in een Wiege in Beschryvinge der stad Dordrecht on Google books
Two paintings inspired by this subject by William Holman Hunt and Laurence Alma-Tadema

1421 births
1468 deaths
People from Dordrecht
Medieval Dutch women
15th-century women of the Holy Roman Empire
People from the county of Holland